Salma Hany Ibrahim Ahmed (born August 5, 1996 in Egypt) is a professional squash player who represents Egypt. She reached a career-high world ranking of 10 in October, 2020.

References

External links 

Egyptian female squash players
Living people
1996 births
21st-century Egyptian women